Another Git Together is an album by the Jazztet, led by trumpeter Art Farmer and saxophonist Benny Golson. It features performances recorded in 1962 and originally released on the Mercury label. It was the band's last recording for 20 years.

Background
The personnel for this album was the same as for the Jazztet's previous recording for Mercury.

Music and recording
"Space Station" is a rapid 24-bar composition by trombonist Moncur. "Domino" is a waltz; "Another Git Together" is a blues. Golson's "Along Came Betty" is faster than its original 1958 version. "This Nearly Was Mine" is from South Pacific and is another waltz, but has additional written material towards the end. This is the first recording of "Reggie", a tribute to composer Golson's second son; it has a "30-bar chorus" and "is a swinging conclusion to the album".

Reception

Scott Yanow of Allmusic states, "This spirited and swinging set has six strong selections".

Track listing
 "Space Station" (Grachan Moncur III) – 5:10   
 "Domino" (Don Raye, Jacques Plante, Louis Ferrari) – 6:58   
 "Another Git Together" (Jon Hendricks, Pony Poindexter) – 6:12   
 "Along Came Betty" (Benny Golson) – 5:24   
 "This Nearly Was Mine" (Richard Rodgers, Oscar Hammerstein II) – 6:20   
 "Reggie" (Benny Golson) – 4:24

Personnel

Musicians
Art Farmer – trumpet, flugelhorn
Benny Golson – tenor saxophone
Grachan Moncur III – trombone 
Harold Mabern – piano
Herbie Lewis – bass
Roy McCurdy – drums

Production
Kay Norton – production
Tommy Nola – recording engineering

References 

Mercury Records albums
Benny Golson albums
1962 albums
Art Farmer albums